Jonathan Edward "Jon" Root (born July 10, 1964) is an American former volleyball player. He was a member of the United States men's national volleyball team that won the gold medal at the 1988 Summer Olympics in Seoul, South Korea. He played college volleyball for Stanford University.

References
 
 USA Olympic Team
 

1964 births
Living people
American men's volleyball players
Stanford Cardinal men's volleyball players
Volleyball players at the 1988 Summer Olympics
Olympic gold medalists for the United States in volleyball
Place of birth missing (living people)
Medalists at the 1988 Summer Olympics
Pan American Games medalists in volleyball
Pan American Games gold medalists for the United States
Medalists at the 1987 Pan American Games